Bala station may refer to:

Rail

US
Bala station (SEPTA), a regional rail station in Bala Cynwyd, Pennsylvania, US

Wales
Bala (Penybont) railway station, railway station in Bala, Gwynedd, Wales
Bala Lake Halt railway station, former railway station in Bala, Gwynedd, Wales
Bala (New) railway station, a former railway station in Bala, Gwynedd, Wales
Bala Junction railway station, a former railway station in Bala, Gwynedd, Wales

Other
Bala transmitting station, a television transmission station near Bala, Gwynedd, Wales

See also
Bala (disambiguation)